In mechanics, suspension is a system of components allowing a machine (normally a vehicle) to move smoothly with reduced shock.

Types may include:
 car suspension, four-wheeled motor vehicle suspension
 motorcycle suspension, two-wheeled motor vehicle suspension
 Motorcycle fork, a component of motorcycle suspension system
 bicycle suspension

Related concepts include:
Shock absorber
Shock mount
Vibration isolation
Magnetic suspension
Electrodynamic suspension
Electromagnetic suspension

See also
Cardan suspension
Seismic base isolation

Mechanics